Dulce Hogar is the second studio album by Virginia Maestro, after the release of Labuat. Released on March 29, 2011, it consists in a collection of fourteen songs completely written by herself, in both Spanish and English. According to some interviews the singer gave, the album is titled Dulce Hogar (Sweet Home), because she felt she was coming back to her roots as a singer-songwriter 
 and to the sound of her childhood. 

The first single was 'The Time is Now'. Both the single and its videoclip were released in February 2011. A special edition of the record contains an EP with a few rare songs, including 'Amanecer' (the Spanish version of 'Run to You'),'Bajo Mi Piel' (Spanish for 'Under My Skin') and 'Vuelve a Mi' (a song she wrote for a Spanish short movie in which she participated).

Track listing 
 "Run to You"
 "Por una vez"
 "The Time Is Now"
 "Hasta Dónde Iré"
 "Te Doy Mi Voz"
 "Insomnio (Insomnio Febril)"
 "107 Veces"
 "Hoy Por Ti"
 "Tal Vez"
 "I Call Your Name"
 "Under My Skin (To Feel You Under My Skin)"
 "Circus"
 "Sin Corazón"
 "Bonus Track: Liten y de Litin"

References 

2011 albums